Woodmere is a hamlet and census-designated place (CDP) in the Town of Hempstead in Nassau County, New York, United States. The population was 17,554 at the 2016 census.

Woodmere is one of the Long Island communities known as the Five Towns, which is usually said to comprise the villages of Lawrence and Cedarhurst, the hamlets of Woodmere and Inwood, and "The Hewletts", which consist of the villages of Hewlett Bay Park, Hewlett Harbor, Hewlett Neck, and Woodsburgh, along with the unincorporated hamlet of Hewlett.

History 
In 1910, Woodmere considered incorporating as a village. These plans, however, were unsuccessful, and Woodmere remains an unincorporated hamlet governed by the Town of Hempstead to this day. Another attempt to incorporate Woodmere as a village was made in 1978; this proposal was also unsuccessful.

Geography

According to the United States Census Bureau, the CDP has a total area of 2.7 square miles (7.0 km2), of which 2.6 square miles (6.6 km2)  is land and 0.1 square mile (0.4 km2)  (5.19%) is water.

Climate 
Woodmere has a wet and cold winter, with a warm and moderately dry summer. The average high is 83 in July and 39 in January. The average low in January is 24 and in July 67.

The rainiest month is May, and the driest month is August. Woodmere is prone to droughts from late July until mid-September. Woodmere can get strong to severe thunderstorms, and it is prone to flooding in the early fall and late spring. It has been hit by a tornado three times, in 1985, 1998, and 2021.

Woodmere was hit by Hurricane Gloria in 1985, Tropical Storm Irene in 2011, and Superstorm Sandy in 2012.

Demographics
As of the census of 2010, there were 17,121 people. The population density was 6,700 people per square mile. The percentage of family households is 86%. The racial makeup of the CDP was 84% White, 5.0% Black, 2.0% Asian, 0% Pacific Islander, 1.0% from other races, and 7% Hispanic.

Woodmere has become home to many Modern Orthodox Jewish families who have established a number of synagogues in Woodmere and throughout much of the Five Towns.

There were 5,349 households, out of which 38.8% had children under the age of 18 living with them, 76.5% were married couples living together, 5.7% had a female householder with no husband present, and 15.4% were non-families. Of all households 13.7% were made up of individuals, and 7.6% had someone living alone who was 65 years of age or older. The average household size was 3.01 and the average family size was 3.32.

In the CDP, the population was spread out, with 28.0% under the age of 18, 5.8% from 18 to 24, 23.2% from 25 to 44, 25.7% from 45 to 64, and 17.3% who were 65 years of age or older. The median age was 41 years. For every 100 females, there were 95.4 males. For every 100 females age 18 and over, there were 91.6 males.

The median income for a household in the CDP was $93,212, and the median income for a family was $119,402. Males had a median income of $76,266 versus $41,393 for females. The per capita income for the CDP was $41,699. About 3.5% of families and 4.3% of the population were below the poverty line, including 5.1% of those under age 18 and 4.0% of those age 65 or over.

Education
Part of the community is in the Hewlett-Woodmere School District (District 14), with the rest being served by the Lawrence Public Schools (District 15).

The Hebrew Academy of Long Beach (HALB) Elementary School for grades 1-8 is a Jewish day school that moved in March 2017 from Long Beach to Woodmere. Their all-boys high school, known as the Davis Renov Stahler Yeshiva HS for Boys (DRS), is also located in Woodmere.

Lawrence Woodmere Academy is a pre-kindergarten through grade 12 coeducational preparatory school.

Transportation 
The Woodmere station provides Long Island Rail Road service on the Far Rockaway Branch. There are also two Nassau Inter-County Express bus routes which travel through and serve Woodmere: the n31 and  the n32.

Fire department
Woodmere is served by the Woodmere Volunteer Fire Department. It provides Fire, Rescue, and Advanced Life Support to Woodmere. It has approximately 75 volunteer members.

Notable people

Notable current and former residents of Woodmere include:
 David A. Adler (born 1947), author of the Cam Jansen series of books.
 Michael Albert (born 1966), pop artist, author and entrepreneur.
 Donatella Arpaia (born 1971), restaurateur and television personality who appears on The Food Network.
 Lynne Barasch, children's book illustrator and author
 Jeff Beacher (born 1973), producer, entrepreneur, and master of ceremonies who created, produced, and hosted the long-running live theater series, Beacher's Madhouse.
 Margot Bennett (born 1935), actress
 Eli M. Black (1921-1975), businessman who controlled the United Brands Company.
 Jane Bowles (1917–1973), writer and playwright
 Peter Diamond (born 1940), winner of the Nobel Memorial Prize in Economic Sciences in 2010.
 Perry Farrell (born 1969), singer-songwriter and musician, best known as the frontman for the alternative rock band Jane's Addiction and creator of the touring festival Lollapalooza.
 Clarence G. Galston (1876-1964), United States district judge of the United States District Court for the Eastern District of New York.
 Jordan Gelber (born 1975), actor and singer who has performed on Broadway in the musical Avenue Q.
 Lisa Glasberg (born 1956), radio and TV personality.
 Alice Glaser (1928-1970), writer and editor.
 Carolyn Goodman (1915-2007), clinical psychologist who became a prominent civil rights advocate after her son, Andrew Goodman, and two other civil rights workers were murdered in Mississippi in 1964.
 Harrison Greenbaum (born 1986), comedian and comedy writer
 Jeffrey Gural (born 1942), New York real estate developer.
 Carolyn Gusoff (born 1963), television news reporter and author.
 Sidney Hertzberg (1922–2005), professional basketball player who played for the New York Knicks in their first season as a team, in 1946–47.
 Mario Alex Joseph (born 1971), Co-Founder and Co-President of the 5 Towns Civic Association, attorney, partner, Joseph & Smargiassi, LLC, inventor, HoodSkulls®, author, The 73rd Virgin
 Alvin M. Josephy Jr. (1915-2005), historian who specialized in Native American topics.
 Donna Karan (born 1948), fashion designer
 Aline Kominsky-Crumb (1948-2022), comics artist
 Stan Lee (1922-2018),  comic book writer, editor, publisher and producer.
 Cy Leslie (1922–2008), founder of Pickwick Records, president and founder of MGM/UA Home Entertainment Group
 Jon Levin (born 1966), guitarist for the heavy metal band Dokken.
 Gene Mayer (born 1956), professional tennis player
 Nancy Shevell McCartney, third wife of Beatle Paul McCartney. Lived in Woodmere from 1995 to 1999 with her ex-husband Bruce Blakeman.
 Harvey Milk (1930–1978), first openly gay man elected to public office in California, member of the San Francisco Board of Supervisors.
 Gerard Piel (1915–2004), publisher of Scientific American, president of the American Association for the Advancement of Science
 Evan Roberts (born 1983), sports radio personality
 Richard E. Rubenstein (born 1938), author and professor
 Shmuel Sackett, religious Zionist leader
 Anne Sayre (1923-1998), writer best known for her biography of Rosalind Franklin, one of the discoverers of the structure of DNA.
 Dov Sternberg, karateka
 Sid Tanenbaum (1925–1986), professional basketball player who played in the NBA for the New York Knicks.
 Moshe Weinberger, rabbi, outreach educator, author, translator and speaker
 Joel Wiener (born 1948 or 1949), billionaire real estate developer and landlord
 Alan Zweibel (born 1950), producer and writer
Jacob Steinmetz (born 2003), first Orthodox Jewish player drafted in Major League Baseball

References

External links

 Woodmere Volunteer Fire Department
 Hewlett Woodmere Public School District

Census-designated places in Nassau County, New York
Census-designated places in New York (state)
Five Towns
Hamlets in Nassau County, New York
Hamlets in New York (state)